Andrea Loredan was a Venetian nobleman of the Loredan family, known as a collector of art. He is notable for commissioning the Ca' Loredan Vendramin Calergi, a palace on the Grand Canal, to designs by Mauro Codussi. The palace was paid for by Doge Leonardo Loredan, it is known for its association with Richard Wagner and the palace today hosts the Casino of Venice. Andrea is also notable for paying for the choir of the church of San Michele in Isola, also designed by Codussi.

In 1513, during the War of the League of Cambrai, he had to accept the role of quartermaster-general for the army, which had closed ranks near Vicenza. Andrea Loredan died in the Battle of La Motta in that same year, beheaded by two soldiers who fought over his body. Loved and respected in Venice, the news of his death brought great sadness to the city. In 1581, his heirs obtained permission from the Council of Ten to sell off the Palace to the Duke of Brunswick for fifty thousand ducats. The Duke had to take loans to be able to afford the grand residence.

The Bust of Andrea Loredan, which is today featured in the Museo Correr, was sculptured by Antonio Rizzo, one of the greatest architects and sculptors of the Venetian Renaissance. Joseph Lindon Smith depicted the bust in one of his paintings, which is today kept in the Harvard Art Museums.

References 

A
1513 deaths